The Jessie Street National Women's Library is a specialist library that collects, preserves, and promotes the awareness of the literary and cultural heritage of Australian women.

History
In response to the difficulty of locating material about the experiences and issues relating to women in Australia, Shirley Jones and Lenore Coltheart developed the concept of a women's library. The objectives of the Library are "to heighten awareness of women's issues; to preserve documents on women's lives and activities; to support the field of women's history and to highlight women's contribution to this country's development."  A committee was established and the Jessie Street Women's Library Association held an inaugural Annual General Meeting in August 1989.

The Library's patrons include Jessie Street's son Sir Laurence Street, the Hon Elizabeth Evatt AC, and poets, Judith Wright and Oodgeroo Noonuccal.

The Library is currently staffed by volunteers and located in the Ultimo Community Centre, a venue provided by the City of Sydney Council.

In memory of Jessie Street
Jessie Street (1889 – 1970) fought hard for many years as an advocate for women's rights in Australia.  She was a key figure in Australian political life for over 50 years, well known for campaigning for human rights and women's issues.  In 1945 at the founding of the United Nations she was the only female Australian delegate. In 1967 she initiated a successful amendment to the Australian constitution  to remove discriminatory references to Aborigines.

Collections
The collections include archives of the papers of Australian women's organisations, the personal papers and letters, diaries and journals of Australian women and also audio recordings of interviews. Many of the books and personal archives in the collection have been donated, including 500 books donated from the estate of feminist Eva Maria and a collection of 110 books by or about Virginia Woolf.

In 1993 the former Canberra Women's Archive was donated to the collection.

See also 

 Lespar Library of Women's Liberation
 The Women's Library

References

Further reading
 A heritage building for the National Women's Library. Women's View, v.3, no.3, Winter 1995: 13
 
 
 
  Vol. 23, no. 1 p. 1

External links
 Australian Women's Archive Project

Feminism in Australia
Archives in Australia
Libraries in New South Wales
Libraries established in 1989
1989 establishments in Australia